Alan Charuk (born June 21, 1954) is a former wide receiver who played eight seasons in the Canadian Football League for the Toronto Argonauts and the BC Lions. Charuk played college football at Acadia University and won the Hec Crighton Trophy in 1974 as the most outstanding Canadian university player.

External links
Career highlights

References

1954 births
Living people
Canadian football wide receivers
Players of Canadian football from New Brunswick
Toronto Argonauts players
BC Lions players
Acadia Axemen football players
Sportspeople from Moncton